The Miskito Cays (Spanish: Cayos Miskitos) are an archipelago with an area of 27 km2 located off shore in the northeastern Caribbean coast of Nicaragua, part of the North Caribbean Coast Autonomous Region. The Miskito Cays are composed of 76 formations that include estuaries, coral reefs, cays, seagrass beds, and islets, of which 12 of the formations are covered with vegetation and consequently form islands which are lined with white sand beaches.

Miskito Cay (Cayo Miskito), also known as Cayo Mayor, is the largest and most important cay located in the center of the archipelago measuring 37 km2. Other main islands are Maras Cay, Nasa Cay, and Morrison Denis Cay

The Miskito Cays Biological Reserve is one of 78 protected areas of Nicaragua, it was declared a protected area in 1991.

References

Caribbean islands of Nicaragua
Protected areas of Nicaragua
Ramsar sites in Nicaragua
North Caribbean Coast Autonomous Region
Uninhabited islands of Nicaragua